Lichmera is a genus of bird in the honeyeater family Meliphagidae.

The genus contains 9 species:
 Olive honeyeater (Lichmera argentauris)
 Brown honeyeater (Lichmera indistincta)
 Grey-eared honeyeater (Lichmera incana)
 Silver-eared honeyeater (Lichmera alboauricularis)
 Scaly-breasted honeyeater (Lichmera squamata)
 Buru honeyeater (Lichmera deningeri)
 Seram honeyeater (Lichmera monticola)
 Flame-eared honeyeater (Lichmera flavicans)
 Black-necklaced honeyeater (Lichmera notabilis)

References

 
Bird genera
Taxonomy articles created by Polbot